The Port of Port Harcourt also called PH Port, is a port complex located in Port Harcourt, Rivers State, Nigeria. The Port first opened in 1913 and can cater to virtually all types of cargo.

References

Port Harcourt